Erin Mills is a bus station in the community of Erin Mills in western Mississauga, Ontario, Canada. It is located northwest of the Erin Mills Parkway/Highway 403 interchange and is a stop on the Mississauga Transitway.

Metrolinx began construction of the Mississauga Transitway West between Winston Churchill Boulevard and Erin Mills Parkway in October 2013 and the entire project was expected to be complete in 2016. The station opened earlier than expected in September 2015 for GO Transit buses but MiWay did not begin serving the station until September 2016.

Bus service

GO Transit
25 Waterloo/Mississauga 
29 Guelph/Mississauga 
45, 46, 46A, 47, 47C Hwy 407 West Corridor

MiWay
29 Park Royal-Homelands
46 Tenth Line-Osprey
48 Erin Mills
100 Airport Express
109 Meadowvale Express
110 University Express

References

External links

Progress at Erin Mills – Mississauga Transitway
BRT Detail Design – Winston Churchill to Erin Mills Parkway (DRAFT)

Mississauga Transitway
GO Transit bus terminals
2015 establishments in Ontario